Beatriz de Palacios was a Spanish woman soldier, nurse and explorer of African and Spanish descent who took part in the Spanish conquest of Mexico. She is widely considered to be one of the first biracial people of partial black ancestry to set foot in the new world.

Biography
Nicknamed "La Parda" due to the tone of her skin (Pardo being an ethnic category, i.e. of mixed ancestry), she arrived to the new world with the expedition of Pánfilo de Narváez along with her husband, Pedro de Escobar, a white Spaniard, as well as her father, Cristobal Palacios. She is mentioned by Francisco Cervantes de Salazar and Bernal Díaz del Castillo among other famous conquerors who often express admiration towards her. Her date of birth is not clear

She served as a nurse under the command of Isabel Rodríguez,  but also fought at the front lines, often taking over the guard duties in place of her husband whenever he was too tired. She tended to his wounds and the wounds of others, saddled the horses, took care of the weapons, and did everything just like any other soldier.

Palacios served with honor during La Noche Triste, helping the Spanish troops evacuate Tenochtitlan, and later took part in the retaking of the city. Both she and her husband survived the conquest and established a family in Cuba.

See also 
 Beatriz González
 Isabel Rodríguez
 Juana Mansilla

References

Spanish explorers
16th-century Spanish women
Spanish conquistadors
African conquistadors
Women in the Conquest of Mexico
Spanish emigrants to Cuba
Spanish people of African descent